Authors of piyyut are known as paytanim (singular: paytan). Piyyut is Jewish liturgical poetry, in Hebrew or occasionally Aramaic.

The earliest authors of piyyut did not sign their names in acrostics, nor do manuscripts preserve their names. The earliest paytan whose name is known is Yosé ben Yosé, usually dated to fifth-century Palestine; he did not sign his name in his work, but copyists of manuscripts preserved it along with his work. Starting in the sixth century, paytanim began to sign their work.

Pre-classical Palestine
(up to the 5th century CE)

  Yosé bar Yosé—5th-century CE Palestine

Classical Palestine
(6th to mid-8th centuries CE)
  Eleazar ben Qallir (or: ben Qillir)—6th- to 7th-century Palestine
  Joshua the Kohen—7th-century Palestine
  Pinḥas the Kohen, son of Jacob—8th-century Tiberias, Palestine
  Simeon bar Megas the Kohen—6th-century Palestine
  Yannai—6th-century Palestine
  Yoḥanan the Kohen, son of Joshua—7th-century Palestine

Post-classical Palestine and the Middle East
(mid-8th to 13th centuries CE)
  Benjamin ben Judah—late 9th- or 10th-century Middle East, perhaps Iraq
  Saadia Gaon—early to mid-10th-century Iraq
  Shelomo Suleiman al-Sanjāry—9th-century Middle East (Syria?)

Apulia (Southern Italy)
  Amittai ben Shefatya—mid- to late 9th-century Oria

Lombardy
  Solomon Ha-bavli—mid-10th century Lombardy

Iberian Peninsula - the Spanish period
  Dunash ben Labrat—mid- to late 10th-century Iberia
  Judah Halevi (also Yehuda Halevi or ha-Levi; Hebrew: יהודה הלוי; Arabic: يهوذا اللاوي; c. 1075 – 1141)
He was born in Málaga about 1021 and is believed to have died around 1058 in Valencia.

Post-Spanish piyyut
  Shlomo ha-Levi Alkabetz author of Lekhah Dodi

Notes

References

External links
 Piyut site - audio recordings of piyyutim, along with corresponding lyrics in Hebrew
    Center of Jewish Music and Poetry

Hebrew-language literature
Jewish law and rituals
Jewish literature
Jewish liturgical poems
Jewish services
Siddur